Bighorn River may refer to:

 Bighorn River, a river in Wyoming and Montana, USA
 Little Bighorn River, tributary of the Bighorn River in the United States in the states of Wyoming and Montana
 Bighorn River (Alberta), a river in Alberta, Canada